Sudamerlycaste locusta is a species of flowering plant in the family Orchidaceae.

Description
S. locusta is a large orchid with night-blooming flowers that smell of apples.

References

 Dr. Henry F. Oakeley, 2008 : Lycaste, Ida and Anguloa: The Essential Guide

Maxillariinae
Flora of Peru